Katalin Cseh (born 29 June 1988) is a Canadian-born Hungarian physician and politician. She was elected as a Momentum Movement (part of the Renew Europe party group) Member of the European Parliament (MEP) in the 2019 parliamentary election.

Early life and career
Katalin Cseh was born on 29 June 1988 in Montreal, Quebec, Canada. Her early education was at Toldy Ferenc High School in Budapest, Hungary. She graduated from Semmelweis University. In 2015, she obtained a master's degree in Health Economics, Policy, and Law from Erasmus University Rotterdam. In the same year, Cseh co-founded Momentum Movement group with nine others. The group campaigned against the Hungarian government's decision to bid for the 2024 Summer Olympics. They petitioned for a referendum on the issue and garnered more than 266,000 signatures. This resulted in the government withdrawing their bid.

Momentum Movement became a centrist political party in March 2017. In August 2017, she was appointed to the governing board of the party. Cseh was a candidate for the party in the 2018 Hungarian parliamentary election. The party did not win any seats in parliament, and the governing board (including Cseh) resigned.

European Parliament
Cseh stood as a candidate for Momentum Movement in the 2019 European parliamentary election.  She was first on her party's list, and was elected as one of its two MEPs (the other being Anna Júlia Donáth) in Hungary. In the European Parliament, she is one of the eight vice-chairs of the Renew Europe political group. Cseh is a member of the Committee on Industry, Research, and Energy (since 2019) and the Subcommittee on Human Rights (since 2020). Since 2021, she has been part of the Parliament's delegation to the Conference on the Future of Europe.

In addition to her committee assignments, Cseh is part of the parliament's delegation for relations with the United States. She is also a supporter of the European Parliament Intergroup on Anti-Corruption, the MEP Alliance for Mental Health and the MEPs Against Cancer group.

Political positions
In 2020, Cseh and Hilde Vautmans initiated an open letter, in which a group of 23 members of the Renew Europe group called on Josep Borrell to push for coordinated sanctions targeted at Chinese leaders and officials responsible for human rights violations in the Xinjiang re-education camps and in Hong Kong.

On 15 September 2022, she was one of 16 MEPs who voted against condemning President Daniel Ortega of Nicaragua for human rights violations, in particular the arrest of Bishop Rolando Álvarez.

References

1988 births
MEPs for Hungary 2019–2024
Living people
Politicians from Montreal
Women MEPs for Hungary
Momentum Movement politicians
21st-century Hungarian politicians
21st-century Hungarian women politicians
Semmelweis University alumni
Erasmus University Rotterdam alumni